Catherine Dale Owen (July 28, 1900  September 7, 1965) was an American stage and film actress.

Early life
Catherine Dale Owen was born in Louisville, Kentucky to a prominent Kentucky family. She attended private school in Philadelphia and Bronxville, New York before attending the American Academy of Dramatic Arts in New York City.

Career
First discovered by Laura MacGillivray, the wife of Actors Equity president Frank Gillmore, Owen appeared on Broadway in the 1920s through early 1930s in productions including The Mountain Man, The Whole Town's Talking, Trelawny of the Wells, The Love City and The Play's the Thing. In 1925, Owen was acclaimed as one of the ten most beautiful women in the world.

Owen made her film debut as Princess Orsolini opposite John Gilbert's Captain Kovacs in the 1929 film His Glorious Night. It was to Owen that Gilbert spoke the lines, "Oh beauteous maiden, my arms are waiting to enfold you. I love you. I love you. I love you." The scene, which proved disastrous for Gilbert's career, was later parodied in the 1952 film Singin' in the Rain.

In 1930, Owen starred in Lawrence Tibbett's film debut, The Rogue Song and also with Edmund Lowe in Born Reckless. Owen appeared in her final film, Defenders of the Law in 1931. She retired from acting in 1935.

Personal life
Owen married Milton F. Davis, Jr., son of Brigadier General Milton F. Davis in 1934. The marriage ended in divorce March 1937. On June 5, 1937, Owen married advertising executive Homer P. Metzger in New York City. The couple had one son, Robert Owen Metzger, born in October 1939.

Owen's likeness was drawn in caricature by Alex Gard for Sardi's, the New York City theater district restaurant. The picture is now part of the collection of the New York Public Library.

Death
On September 3, 1965, Owen suffered a stroke at her New York City home. She was taken to Lenox Hill Hospital where she slipped into a coma. She died there on September 7 at the age of 65. She is buried in the Old Tennent Cemetery in Manalapan Township, New Jersey.

Filmography

See also
List of caricatures at Sardi's restaurant

Notes

References
Bradley, Edwin M. The First Hollywood Musicals: A Critical Filmography of 171 Features, 1927 Through 1932. Jefferson, N.C.: McFarland & Co, 1996.
Lennig, Arthur. The Immortal Count: The Life and Films of Bela Lugosi. Lexington: University Press of Kentucky, 2003.
"Catherine D. Owen Plans her Bridal", The New York Times, December 12, 1934
"To Sue Milton Davis, Jr. Catherine Dale Owen in Nevada for Divorce Action Soon", The New York Times, February 11, 1937
Wayne, Jane Ellen. The Golden Girls of MGM: Greta Garbo, Joan Crawford, Lana Turner, Judy Garland, Ava Gardner, Grace Kelly, and Others. New York: Carroll & Graf, 2003.
Wayne, Jane Ellen. The Leading Men of MGM. New York: Carroll & Graf Publishers, 2005.

External links

Photographs of Catherine Dale Owen
University of Louisville Photographic Archives: Catherine Dale Owen
University of Louisville Photographic Archives: Catherine Dale Owen, 1930
University of Louisville Photographic Archives: Catherine Dale Owen with fur collar

1900 births
1965 deaths
20th-century American actresses
American Academy of Dramatic Arts alumni
Actresses from Louisville, Kentucky
American film actresses
American silent film actresses
American stage actresses
Burials at Old Tennent Cemetery